Fencing at the 1998 Asian Games was held in Thammasat Gymnasium 4, Bangkok, Thailand from December 9 to December 18, 1998.

Medalists

Men

Women

Medal table

References
 Results

 
1998 Asian Games events
1998
Asian Games
International fencing competitions hosted by Thailand